This is a list of United Nations Security Council Resolutions 2101 to 2200 adopted between 25 April 2013 and 12 February 2015.

See also 
 Lists of United Nations Security Council resolutions
 List of United Nations Security Council Resolutions 2001 to 2100
 List of United Nations Security Council Resolutions 2201 to 2300

References

2101